Suzhou Xindi Center is a 54-floor 232 meter (761 foot) tall skyscraper completed in 2006 located in Suzhou, China.

See also
 List of tallest buildings in the world

External links
Emporis.com – Suzhou Xindi Center

Buildings and structures in Suzhou
Skyscrapers in Suzhou
Skyscraper office buildings in China
Residential skyscrapers in China
Skyscraper hotels in Suzhou